Ząbrowo may refer to the following places:
Ząbrowo, Pomeranian Voivodeship (north Poland)
Ząbrowo, Warmian-Masurian Voivodeship (north Poland)
Ząbrowo, Kołobrzeg County in West Pomeranian Voivodeship (north-west Poland)
Ząbrowo, Świdwin County in West Pomeranian Voivodeship (north-west Poland)